Dijana Števin (born 23 October 1986) is a Serbian handballer for Celles Sur Belle and the Serbian national team.

Achievements
Serbian Championship:
Winner: 2011
Serbian Cup:
Winner: 2011

References

External links

Living people
1986 births
Sportspeople from Zrenjanin
Serbian female handball players
Expatriate handball players
Serbian expatriate sportspeople in France
Serbian expatriate sportspeople in Montenegro
Mediterranean Games competitors for Serbia
Competitors at the 2009 Mediterranean Games
21st-century Serbian women